Jirighat is a block headquarters in Cachar district, Assam, India. Jirighat is a tea estate.

Geography
It is located at an elevation of 28 m above MSL.

Location
National Highway 37 (old NH 53) passes through Jirighat.

References

External links
 Satellite map of Jirighat

Silchar
Villages in Cachar district